The Democratic Centrist Tendency was an Iraqi political party founded in 2000 in London by Iraqi exiles who were opposed to the rule of Saddam Hussein. The group publishes the newspaper Al-Nahdah.

Supporters

The founder members included:

 Secretary-General: Adnan Pachachi, Foreign Minister and UN Ambassador under the 1960s Nationalist government of Abdul Salam Arif
 Deputy Secretary-General: Mahdi al-Hafez, foreign service officer at the UN in Geneva under Saddam Hussein during the 1970s who became Minister of Planning under the Iraqi Governing Council
 Executive Committee Member: Maysoon al-Damluji, Senior Deputy Culture Minister in the Iraqi Governing Council, later Member of Parliament
 Executive Committee Member: Ayham al-Samarie, who became Minister of Electricity in the Iraqi Governing Council
 Executive Committee Member: Feisal al-Istrabadi, legal drafter of the Transitional Administrative Law, appointed Ambassador and Deputy Permanent Representative of Iraq to the UN
 Hussein Ali al-Shaalan

It participated in the Follow-Up and Arrangement Committee in the lead up to the 2003 invasion of Iraq.

References

2000 establishments in Iraq
Defunct political parties in Iraq
Iraqi democracy movements
Political parties established in 2000
Political parties with year of disestablishment missing